Antonia Noori Farzan is an American journalist. She was educated in Hamilton College and Columbia University. Farzan was a journalist for Business Insider, The Independent and  the Phoenix New Times. She writes for the Washington Post. In 2017 Farzan won the George Polk Award with Joseph Flaherty for her article in the Phoenix New Times which revealed "that Motel 6 motels in Phoenix, Arizona, provided nightly guest rosters to ICE".

References 

American journalists
George Polk Award recipients
Living people
Year of birth missing (living people)
Columbia University alumni